GET-ligaen Playoff MVP is a Norwegian ice hockey award which is awarded annually to the player judged most valuable to his team during the GET-ligaen playoffs. It was first awarded in 2007.

The trophy itself is much larger than Kongepokalen which is the prize the Norwegian ice hockey clubs compete for each year in order to become Norwegian ice hockey champions.

Winners

References

Norwegian ice hockey trophies and awards
Norway
GET-ligaen
Awards established in 2007
2007 establishments in Norway